In mathematics, a Frobenius splitting, introduced by , is a splitting of the injective morphism OX→F*OX from a structure sheaf OX of a characteristic p > 0 variety X to its image F*OX under the Frobenius endomorphism F*.

 give a detailed discussion of Frobenius splittings.

A fundamental property of Frobenius-split projective schemes X is that the higher cohomology Hi(X,L)  (i > 0) of ample line bundles L vanishes.

References

External links
Conference on Frobenius splitting in algebraic geometry, commutative algebra, and representation theory at Michigan, 2010.

Algebraic geometry